Vexillum oniscinum is a species of small sea snail, marine gastropod mollusk in the family Costellariidae, the ribbed miters.

Description

Distribution

References

External links
  Lamarck (.B.M.de). (1811). Suite de la détermination des espèces de Mollusques testacés. Mitre (Mitra.). Annales du Muséum National d'Histoire Naturelle. 17: 195–222.

oniscinum
Gastropods described in 1811